Carapelli Computers is a Taiwanese company founded in 1983 with the goal of linking manufacturers based in South East Asia to the world's merchandise trading markets.

By 1986 Carapelli was exporting various computer parts to Canada and India including computer casings, power supplies, motherboards & additional add-on peripherals and by 1991 the company had started exporting notebooks from every OEM manufacturer under the Impulse brand moniker to Canada.  At that time Impulse was ranked 3rd in notebook sales nationwide.

In 1987 Carapelli expanded its operations to Hong Kong and Bangkok in a move to expand the company's market share in general merchandise and computers. By 1997 the group's turnover had exceeded USD 50 Million and was still growing.

In 1994 Carapelli further expanded its operations to the United Arab Emirates by opening two import facilities. Carapelli Computers was started in Dubai, United Arab Emirates with both a retail and wholesale strategy.

In the year 2001, Carapelli again expanded its operations by establishing a large retail and wholesale presence in the U.A.E.'s trade capital Dubai and subsequently in the year 2002 Carapelli created two more branch locations at the Jebel Ali freezone port and in Abu Dhabi, the capital of the United Arab Emirates. The former was created to increase Carapelli's distribution abilities to the whole of the Middle East and Africa, and the latter was established in order to gain a larger retail and wholesale presence within the capital of the nation.

In the year 2006, Carapelli invested in a manufacturing presence in mainland China, producing media products and GPS systems and in 2008 the focus shifted to the manufacturing of laptop computers for the masses.

World's Cheapest Laptop 
In 2008 Carapelli launched the Impulse NPX-9000, which is claimed to be the world's cheapest notebook, at a wholesale price of U.S. $129.00.

References 
ITP Review of the Impulse NPX-9000

Computer World Announcement of Impulse NPX-9000 Launch

OLPC News Announcement of Impulse NPX-9000 Launch

External links 
 Impulse NPX-9000 Official Home Page

Electronics companies of Taiwan